The 1874 Wigtown Burghs by-election was fought on 12 June 1874.  The byelection was fought due to the resignation of the incumbent Liberal MP, George Young, to become a Judge of the Court of Session.  It was won by the Conservative candidate Mark John Stewart.

References

1874 in Scotland
1870s elections in Scotland
Wigtownshire
Politics of Dumfries and Galloway
1874 elections in the United Kingdom
By-elections to the Parliament of the United Kingdom in Scottish constituencies